Siniša Đurić (Serbian Cyrillic: Cинишa Ђуpић; born 20 February 1976 in Banja Luka) is a Bosnian Serb football manager and former player. He is, from January 2010, the assistant manager of Vinko Marinović at FK Kozara Gradiška and he is taking care of the youth teams, as well.

International career
He holds the record of appearances, 22, for the Yugoslavia under-19 team.

External links
 Profile at Srbijafudbal.
 Fokus.ba career story 

1976 births
Living people
Sportspeople from Banja Luka
Serbs of Bosnia and Herzegovina
Association football forwards
Bosnia and Herzegovina footballers
FK Borac Banja Luka players
FK Zemun players
FK Kozara Gradiška players
FK Laktaši players
First League of Serbia and Montenegro players
Premier League of Bosnia and Herzegovina players
First League of the Republika Srpska players
Bosnia and Herzegovina expatriate footballers
Expatriate footballers in Serbia and Montenegro
Bosnia and Herzegovina expatriate sportspeople in Serbia and Montenegro
Expatriate footballers in Germany
Bosnia and Herzegovina expatriate sportspeople in Germany
Bosnia and Herzegovina football managers
FK Kozara Gradiška managers